"Hello (Paradise Kiss)" is the nineteenth single by Japanese pop singer-songwriter Yui. It was released on June 1, 2011.

Background and writing 
The single was written and composed by YUI. She said that she attempted to make the song sound pop-like, while trying to add a slight pizzicato which she picked up from the atmosphere of Paradise Kiss. She also said the song was one of deciding to prepare oneself, while finding answers as you mature.

Promotion and tie-ins 
The A-Side "Hello (Paradise Kiss)" was composed to be the theme song of the live action movie Paradise Kiss based on the popular manga created by Ai Yazawa. The B-Side "You" was composed to be the ending song of the same movie. The first press editions came with original illustrations by Ai Yazawa and postcards were also included for some customers in Japan.

Music video 
The music video depicts Yui in a variety of clothes while strumming a guitar.

Track list

Sales Charts (Japan)

The single was certified gold by the Recording Industry Association of Japan (RIAJ) for having shipped more than 100,000 copies to stores.

References

2011 singles
Yui (singer) songs
Songs written by Yui (singer)
Japanese film songs
Gr8! Records singles